The Covington, Columbus and Black Hills Railroad is an historic narrow gauge railroad that operated in the U.S. state of Nebraska.

In 1879 it merged to become part of the Sioux City and Nebraska Railroad.  It later merged into the Chicago, Saint Paul, Minneapolis and Omaha Railway which saw the line extended to Wynot.

References

3 ft 6 in gauge railways in the United States
American companies established in 1875
Defunct Nebraska railroads
Narrow gauge railroads in Nebraska
Predecessors of the Chicago and North Western Transportation Company
Railway companies disestablished in 1879
Railway companies established in 1875